Peggy M. Rajski is an American filmmaker, best known for directing and co-producing the 1994 American short film Trevor, which won an Academy Award for "Best Live Action Short Film" at the 67th Annual Academy Awards in 1995. She is also a co-founder of The Trevor Project, a crisis-intervention organization for LGBTQ+ youth, and an academic who has taught producing and filmmaking. In June 2018, Rajski became dean of the Loyola Marymount University School of Film and Television in Los Angeles, California. In November 2022 she became Interim CEO of The Trevor Project.

Early life and filmmaking career
Rajski was born and raised in Stevens Point, Wisconsin, in the large family of Pat A. Rajski and Patricia A. (Simon) Rajski. After graduating from Pacelli High School, Rajski received a bachelor's degree from the University of Wisconsin–Stevens Point, and a master of fine arts degree from the University of Wisconsin–Madison. Following her graduation, she moved to New York to pursue a career in the film industry, initially working as a receptionist at "a New York firm that did corporate films", and then joining a production group, quickly rising to prominence.

She was soon hired as a production manager by writer/director John Sayles for his 1983 film Lianna. She went on to produce a number of Sayles's early films, including The Brother from Another Planet (1984), Matewan (1987), and Eight Men Out (1988), also working with other filmmakers to produce Little Man Tate (1991; directed by and starring Jodie Foster), The Grifters (1990; directed by Stephen Frears and co-produced with Martin Scorsese), and Home for the Holidays (1995; also in collaboration with Jodie Foster).

In 1994, Rajski directed the American short film Trevor and co-produced it with Randy Stone. Written by Celeste Lecesne and set in 1981, the film follows a 13-year-old boy named Trevor, a Diana Ross fan, when his crush on a schoolmate named Pinky Faraday is discovered. In 1995, Trevor tied for an Oscar for Best Short Subject with Franz Kafka's It's a Wonderful Life at the 67th Academy Awards. It also won the Teddy Award for Best Short in 1995. In 1998, Rajski co-founded The Trevor Project, recruiting Stone and Lecesne to create a 24/7 crisis intervention and suicide prevention organization for lesbian, gay, bisexual, transgender and questioning youth.

In 2003, she also directed episodes of the TV series, ER; she was the only new director introduced in the show's ninth season. In 2012, Rajski worked with the producers of Glee to address teen suicide in the episode, "On My Way", with a public service announcement for The Trevor Project being included in the episode. The episode resulted in a record number of calls to the non-profit’s hotline, and record traffic to its website. Rajski stated that because the show "worked in conjunction" with The Trevor Project, the organization was prepared in advance to handle the increase in hotline traffic, which was "triple the [usual] number of calls." They also saw a nearly sevenfold increase to 10,000 website visitors on the evening the program aired.

On August 9, 2017, the Writers Theatre in Chicago premiered "Trevor the Musical", adapted from Trevor. , it was being adapted as a Broadway musical.

Academic career
From 2010 to 2018, Rajski was head of studies for producing at New York University Tisch School of the Arts graduate film program. During this time, the University of Wisconsin–Stevens Point named Rajski a College of Fine Arts and Communication Distinguished Alumnus in 2014.

Rajski was named Dean of the Loyola Marymount University School of Film & Television in 2018. In April 2019, she was a speaker and panel moderator at Film Independent's 14th annual Film Independent Forum, and is a frequent guest lecturer and panelist at industry events in Los Angeles and elsewhere.

Filmography

See also
 List of female film and television directors
 List of LGBT-related films directed by women

References

External links

 Loyola Marymount University faculty biography page for Peggy Rajski
 The Trevor Project biography page for Peggy Rajski
 Film Independent biography page for Peggy Rajski
 The Writer's Theatre interview, In Conversation: Peggy Rajski (September 29, 2017)

People from Stevens Point, Wisconsin
Loyola Marymount University faculty
New York University faculty
Directors of Live Action Short Film Academy Award winners
Producers who won the Live Action Short Film Academy Award
Year of birth missing (living people)
Living people